The Field Estate (also known as the Wealake or Field Club of Sarasota) is a historic site in Sarasota, Florida. It is located at Field Road and Camino Real. On June 5, 1986, it was added to the U.S. National Register of Historic Places.

References and external links

 Sarasota County listings at National Register of Historic Places
 Sarasota County listings at Florida's Office of Cultural and Historical Programs

Houses on the National Register of Historic Places in Sarasota County, Florida
Houses in Sarasota, Florida
David Adler buildings
Houses completed in 1927